Larkhall Academy is a non-denominational coeducational secondary school in Larkhall, South Lanarkshire, Scotland. The current head teacher is Andy Smith. The school has an additional support needs department. The school's catchment area includes the town of Larkhall as well as the villages of Stonehouse, Ashgill and Netherburn.

History 
Larkhall Academy Subscription School was founded in Union Street in 1868. In 1972, the school premises were moved to Cherryhill. The new school building opened in 2009 and headteacher Tom Dingwall retired shortly after. 

In 2018, former head teacher Bryan Kee resigned. On 14 June 2018 the school was awarded Digital Schools status for promoting digital skills in their classrooms. The S4 and S6 pupils recorded the best SQA exam results since the introduction of the new qualifications in 2014.

Gallery

References

Secondary schools in South Lanarkshire
Larkhall
1868 establishments in Scotland
Educational institutions established in 1868
School buildings completed in 2009
School buildings completed in 1972